Kathleen Donohue (born 1963)  is an American biologist at Duke University. She researches how adaptation occurs on a genetic basis and received a Guggenheim Fellowship in 2013 for her work.

Education
Kathleen Donohue attended Stanford University, graduating in 1985 with two bachelor's degrees. She then attended the University of Chicago for her master's degree (1988) and PhD (1993). Her doctoral advisor was Ellen Simms and her dissertation was titled "The evolution of seed disperal in Cakile edentula var. lacustis".

Career
In her early career, she was a faculty member at the University of Kentucky and Harvard University. In 2008 she was hired at Duke University as an associate professor. She was appointed to full professor in 2012. She researches how adaptation occurs on a genetic basis, including phenotypic plasticity, maternal effect, epigenetics, niche construction, biological dispersal, natural selection at multiple scales. From 2017 to 2020 she was director of Duke's ecology program.

Selected publications

Awards and honors
In 2013 she was awarded a Guggenheim Fellowship in the plant sciences division. She was an elected fellow of the American Association for the Advancement of Science in 2012 and of the National Institute for Mathematical and Biological Synthesis in 2013. In 2015 she served as president of the American Society of Naturalists.

References

Living people
Stanford University alumni
University of Chicago alumni
University of Kentucky faculty
Harvard University faculty
Duke University faculty
American women scientists
American ecologists
Women ecologists
Fellows of the American Association for the Advancement of Science
1963 births
American women academics
21st-century American women